Patrick Joseph "P.J." McDonald (born 1982) is a Group One winning Irish jockey and President (Flat) of the Professional Jockeys' Association.

Career

McDonald was born in County Wexford and started to ride ponies as a child at his grandmother's cottage.

Having been taught to ride horses by Dusty Sheehy, McDonald began his career as a jump jockey, with Padge Berry mentoring him as a point-to-point rider. However, he only won 3 out of 70 races in his first four years racing under rules, as a rider for trainer Charles O'Brien and considered giving up. He was then persuaded to move to England by an ex-jockey and friend, Michael Cleary, to save his career.

In England, he rode for Ferdy Murphy, for whom he won the Scottish Grand National on Hot Weld in 2007. McDonald credits Murphy for helping his development as a jockey: '[He] gave me the confidence, he gave me the platform and he guided me the right way'. Murphy persuaded McDonald to spend a summer flat racing as a means of keeping fit, although finding he felt healthier for it, he continued under that code, with a caveat that he could return to Murphy if he liked.

Progressing slowly, his first major success as a flat jockey was winning the 2016 Yorkshire Cup on Clever Cookie, deputising for Danny Tudhope who has been injured in a fall the previous day. The following year at York he also won the Lonsdale Cup on Montaly, trained by Andrew Balding. Also in 2017, he won two Group races on Havana Grey - the National Stakes at Sandown Park and the Molecomb Stakes at Glorious Goodwood.

His most famous connection, however, is with the Karl Burke-trained Laurens who was runner-up in the 2018 1,000 Guineas, before winning two French Group Ones - the Prix Saint-Alary and Prix de Diane. However, after being thrown from a horse in the parade ring at Newcastle, he fractured his heel and ankle, and missed several weeks of the season during which Laurens won two late season Group Ones under Tudhope. Returning to ride Laurens in the Queen Elizabeth II Stakes at Ascot Champions Day, he finished 8th behind Roaring Lion, but would win another Group One, the Prix Rothschild in July 2019.

He is retained jockey to Laurens' owner John Dance and rides most regularly for trainer Karl Burke. He also rides for Mark Johnston. He has been the Professional Jockeys' Association's safety officer in the North since 2010 and in July 2018 was appointed Flat President of the PJA, replacing Steve Drowne.

Personal life

He lives in Leyburn, North Yorkshire and is married to Abby, who he met at Ferdy Murphy's stables. They have two daughters - Amelia and Lavinia.

Statistics

Flat wins in Great Britain by year

Major wins 
 Great Britain
Fillies' Mile - Laurens (2017)
King George VI and Queen Elizabeth Stakes - Pyledriver (2022)
 France
Prix de Diane - Laurens (2018)
Prix Rothschild - Laurens (2019) 
Prix Saint-Alary - Laurens (2018)

Notes

References 

Irish jockeys
1982 births
Living people
Sportspeople from County Wexford